The Stadio Flaminio is a stadium in Rome. It lies along the Via Flaminia, three kilometres northwest of the city centre, 300 metres away from the Parco di Villa Glori.

The interior spaces include a covered swimming pool, rooms for fencing, amateur wrestling, weightlifting, boxing and gymnastics.

History 
Pier Luigi Nervi designed the Flaminio Stadium with his son, the architect Antonio Nervi, between 1957 and 1958. The structure was built for the XVII Olympic Games in Rome (1960) and inaugurated in 1959. The Stadio Flaminio was built on the site of the previous Stadio Nazionale PNF. It was mostly devoted to football matches and served as the venue for the football final in the 1960 Summer Olympics.

This stadium is a remarkable example of different ways to use concrete: in situ castings, prefabricated elements, undulating slabs of ferrocement. The Flaminio Stadium is a unique work that offers a highly original union between form and structure and between architecture and engineering. It testifies to a special and internationally recognised period for Italian architectural culture, characterised by a highly fertile relationship between different disciplines. The project also frames a unique moment in the work of Pier Luigi Nervi, unanimously recognised as the most ingenious Italian engineer and a pioneer of the study and use of reinforced concrete.

Abandoned for years, the stadium is now in an advanced state of decay. This degeneration can be traced back to three principal causes: improper interventions that failed to respect the characteristics of the original structure, widespread deterioration caused by years of neglect and the physiological aging of materials and plant systems.

In July 2017, with the cooperation of the Municipality of Rome, Sapienza University, Pier Luigi Nervi Project Association and DO.CO.MO.MO. Italy received a grant from the Getty Foundation and its Keeping it Modern program to prepare a conservation plan for the Stadio Flaminio.

As of August 2021, much of the main stadium is in a state of disrepair.

Events
Pink Floyd performed two concerts on 11 and 12 July 1988 during their A Momentary Lapse of Reason Tour.
U2 performed there in 1987 in front of 45 000 fans.

Bruce Springsteen played 2 sellout concerts in June 1988 both concerts was attended by a crowd of 40,000 Fans at a total of 80,000 people for his Tunnel of Love express tour having opened his European tour in Turin in front of 65 000 people with one concert at Stadio Communale.

Michael Jackson performed two sell-out concerts on 23 and 24 May 1988 during his Bad World Tour. Each concert was attended by a crowd of 40,000 fans. Police and security guards rescued hundreds of fans from being crushed in the crowd. Jackson also performed another sell-out concert on 4 July 1992 during the Dangerous World Tour, in front of 40,000 fans. An amateur recording can be found on YouTube for both concerts.

David Bowie played in front of 45, 000 people 1987.

Rugby
It was the home of Italy rugby union national team for Six Nations tournament home matches from Italy's entry in the competition in 2000 until 2011.

The Italian Rugby Federation (FIR) announced, in January 2010, that the stadium would undergo an expansion, that will increase its capacity to 42,000, before the 2012 Six Nations Championship. A failure to progress these plans has been cited as the reason for moving Italy's home Six Nations games from 2012. With a capacity of 32,000 (8,000 covered), it was the smallest of the Six Nations stadiums. It is no longer considered big enough for the Italian national team and there were frequent reports that the national team would move to Genoa or to the Stadio Olimpico di Roma. This change was confirmed with the Italian Rugby Federation (FIR) becoming upset at broken promises of renovations. It was initially reported that the FIR would move Six Nations matches to Stadio Artemio Franchi in Florence. However, when the city finally began the promised renovations, FIR announced that it would instead keep its Six Nations home fixtures in Rome at Stadio Olimpico, and that it would return to the Flaminio once the project is completed.

The stadium was originally slated to become the home of Praetorians Roma, a newly formed team that would be one of Italy's two representatives in the Celtic League. However, it was later decided that Benetton Treviso would replace Praetorians.

Football
In 1989–90 season both Roma and Lazio played at Stadio Flaminio during the renovations of Stadio Olimpico. Stadio Flaminio was also the home of Atletico Roma F.C., an association football club who played in Lega Pro Prima Divisione, but were dissolved in 2011. In 2021, Italian newspaper Leggo reported that Lazio president Claudio Lotito had made an 'important and serious proposal' to increase the capacity of the stadium to 40,000 and to return the club to the stadium on a permanent basis.

References

1959 establishments in Italy
Rugby union stadiums in Italy
Football venues in Italy
Sports venues in Rome
Venues of the 1960 Summer Olympics
Olympic football venues
Italy
Rome Q. II Parioli
A.S. Lodigiani
Pier Luigi Nervi buildings